Sorolopha is a genus of moths belonging to the subfamily Olethreutinae of the family Tortricidae.

Species
Sorolopha aeolochlora (Meyrick, 1916)
Sorolopha agalma Diakonoff, 1973
Sorolopha agana (Falkovitsh, 1966)
Sorolopha agathopis (Meyrick, 1927)
Sorolopha archimedias (Meyrick, 1912)
Sorolopha arctosceles (Meyrick, 1931)
Sorolopha argyropa Diakonoff, 1973
Sorolopha artocincta Diakonoff, 1973
Sorolopha asphaeropa Diakonoff, 1973
Sorolopha asymmetrana Kuznetzov, 2003
Sorolopha atmochlora (Meyrick, 1930)
Sorolopha auribasis Diakonoff, 1973
Sorolopha authadis Diakonoff, 1973
Sorolopha autoberylla (Meyrick, 1932)
Sorolopha bathysema Diakonoff, 1973
Sorolopha bruneiregalis Tuck & Robinson, 1993
Sorolopha brunnorbis Razowski, 2009
Sorolopha bryana (Felder & Rogenhofer, 1875)
Sorolopha callichlora (Meyrick, 1909)
Sorolopha camarotis (Meyrick, 1936)
Sorolopha caryochlora Diakonoff, 1973
Sorolopha cervicata Diakonoff, 1973
Sorolopha chiangmaiensis Kawabe, 1989
Sorolopha chlorotica Liu & Bai, 1985
Sorolopha chortodes (Diakonoff, 1968)
Sorolopha compsitis (Meyrick, 1912)
Sorolopha cyclotoma Lower, 1901
Sorolopha delochlora (Turner, 1916)
Sorolopha dictyonophora Diakonoff, 1973
Sorolopha dorsichlora Razowski, 2009
Sorolopha doryphora Diakonoff, 1973
Sorolopha dyspeista Diakonoff, 1973
Sorolopha elaeodes (Lower, 1908)
Sorolopha englyptopa (Meyrick, 1938)
Sorolopha epichares Diakonoff, 1973
Sorolopha euochropa Diakonoff, 1973
Sorolopha eurychlora Diakonoff, 1973
Sorolopha ferruginosa Kawabe, 1989
Sorolopha ghilarovi Kuznetzov, 1988
Sorolopha herbifera (Meyrick, 1909)
Sorolopha homalopa (Diakonoff, 1968)
Sorolopha hydrargyra (Meyrick, 1931)
Sorolopha johngreeni Horak, 2006
Sorolopha karsholti Kawabe, 1989
Sorolopha khaoyaiensis Kawabe, 1989
Sorolopha leptochlora (Turner, 1916)
Sorolopha liochlora (Meyrick, 1914)
Sorolopha longurus Liu & Bai, 1982
Sorolopha margaritopa (Dianokoff, 1953)
Sorolopha melanocycla Diakonoff, 1973
Sorolopha metastena Diakonoff, 1973
Sorolopha micheliacola Liu, 2001
Sorolopha mniochlora (Meyrick, 1907)
Sorolopha muscida (Wileman & Stringer, 1929)
Sorolopha nagaii Kawabe, 1989
Sorolopha nucleata Diakonoff, 1973
Sorolopha phyllochlora (Meyrick, 1905)
Sorolopha plinthograpta (Meyrick, 1931)
Sorolopha plumboviridis Diakonoff, 1973
Sorolopha prasinias (Meyrick, 1916)
Sorolopha rubescens Diakonoff, 1973
Sorolopha saitoi Kawabe, 1989
Sorolopha semiculta (Meyrick, 1909)
Sorolopha semifulva (Meyrick, 1908)
Sorolopha sphaerocopa (Meyrick, in de Joannis, 1930)
Sorolopha stygiaula (Meyrick, 1933)
Sorolopha tenuirurus Liu & Bai, 1982
Sorolopha timiochlora Diakonoff, 1973

See also
List of Tortricidae genera

References

External links
Tortricidae.com

Olethreutini
Tortricidae genera